The R541 is a Regional Route in South Africa.

Route
Its north-western origin is the R36 near Machadodorp, Mpumalanga. From there it heads south-east, to meet the R38. It is co-signed for 6 kilometres heading south-west to Badplaas. From Badplaas it diverges and again heads south-east, ending in Lochiel at an intersection with the N17.

References

Regional Routes in Mpumalanga